John Hoad (8 October 1891 – 1 December 1971) was a Barbadian cricketer. He played in three first-class matches for the Barbados cricket team from 1919 to 1922.

See also
 List of Barbadian representative cricketers

References

External links
 

1891 births
1971 deaths
Barbadian cricketers
Barbados cricketers
People from Saint Michael, Barbados